Martin Svensson (born 10 August 1989) is a Danish former footballer who played as a winger for Nykøbing FC.

Career
He started his career in Silkeborg IF. He got his official debut for the team in a match against Ølstykke. 
In June 2013 he signed a 2-year long contract with Randers FC. In 2016, he had a short spell with Icelandic Úrvalsdeild teams Víkingur Reykjavík and Víkingur Ólafsvík.

References

External links
 

Living people
1989 births
Danish men's footballers
Silkeborg IF players
Randers FC players
Viborg FF players
Vejle Boldklub players
Knattspyrnufélagið Víkingur players
Ungmennafélagið Víkingur players
Nykøbing FC players
Danish Superliga players
Danish 1st Division players
Association football wingers